Bucay may refer to:
Bucay, Ecuador, a town in Ecuador
Bucay, Abra, a municipality in the Philippines
Jorge Bucay, an Argentinian writer